Volkert Overlander (also Volcker and Volckert Overlander; 7 October 1570 – 18 October 1630) was a Dutch noble, jurist, ship-owner, merchant and an Amsterdam regent from the Dutch Golden Age.

Biography
Volkert was born in Amsterdam, the son of Nicolaes Overlander  († 1607), a merchant, and Catharina Sijs (1536–1617). He studies law at the University of Leiden and finished at the University of Basel in 1595. In 1599 he married Geertruid Hooft; his sister Gertruid (1577–1653) married Geertruids brother Pieter Jansz Hooft. The couple had ten children; Maria Overlander van Purmerland ∞ Frans Banning Cocq and Geertruid Overlander (1609–1634) ∞ Cornelis de Graeff. Volkert lived with his family at the cityhouse De Dolphijn.

In 1602 he became one of the founders of the Dutch East Trading Company. Between 1614 and 1621 Volkert became a councillor of the Admiralty of Amsterdam. In 1618 Volkert bought the Free and High Fief Ilpendam and Purmerland from the Creditor from the Count of Egmond. He built the castle of Ilpenstein in 1622. He was made first Dijkgraaf of the Purmer in early 1620s. He became an English knight in 1620. In the years 1621 and 1628 Volkert became mayor of Amsterdam. Between 1628 and 1629 Volkert became an advisor of the States of Holland and West Friesland. He owned 150.000 Guilder. He died in The Hague, aged 60.

External links
 Volkert Overlander at Heren van Holland
 Volkert Overlander at Historische Geslachtswapens

Literature
 Elias, J.E., De vroedschap van Amsterdam (1903-5 Haarlem), p. 274
 Moelker, H.P., De heerlijkheid Purmerland en Ilpendam (1978 Purmerend), p. 120-124

1570 births
1630 deaths
Nobility from Amsterdam
Lords of Purmerland and Ilpendam
Mayors of Amsterdam
Dutch East India Company people from Amsterdam
Founders of the Dutch East India Company